Enciclopedia Salvat, long title Diccionario Enciclopédico Salvat Universal is a Spanish-language encyclopedia compiled and published by Editorial Salvat (Salvat Editores), a well-known house in development and publication of dictionaries and reference works on various levels.

The 20-volume 16,000 page alphabetically arranged and illustrated encyclopedia focuses on the core areas of knowledge: Physics, Chemistry, Biology, Ecology, Mathematics, Philosophy and Religion, Medicine, Language and Literature, History and Geography, Arts, Technology, IT, Sports etc. with related references wherever needed. The recent update also launched a unique system for summaries accompanied by a new design and layout.

References

Spanish encyclopedias